Aroha Savage (born 11 March 1990) is a rugby union player. She previously played for the Blues Women in the Super Rugby Aupiki competition. She has competed for the Black Ferns at three Rugby World Cup's — 2010, 2014 and 2017.

Rugby career

Provincial 
Savage debuted for the Auckland Storm in 2007 as a 17-year-old. She helped the Storm to several provincial titles, she then moved to Counties Manukau in 2013 and helped them win the 2016 Farah Palmer Cup title. She later moved to Northland in 2020.

International 
Savage was a member of the 2010 Rugby World Cup winning squad. On 24 August 2010, she made her test debut for the Black Ferns aged 20 against the Wallaroos at the Rugby World Cup.

Savage was in the Black Ferns squad for the 2013 International Series against .

Savage was named in the squad to the 2014 Women's Rugby World Cup in France. She was also included in the 2017 Women's Rugby World Cup squad.

On 3 November 2021, She was named as captain of the Blues squad for the inaugural Super Rugby Aupiki competition. She started in the Blues 0–35 thrashing by the Chiefs Manawa in the final round.

In 2022, She signed with Hurricanes Poua for the 2023 Super Rugby Aupiki season.

References

External links
 Aroha Savage at Black Ferns

1990 births
Living people
New Zealand women's international rugby union players
New Zealand female rugby union players
Rugby union locks
Auckland rugby union players